Eddie Shea (11 June 1915 – 19 November 1978) was an Australian rules footballer who played with Hawthorn in the Victorian Football League (VFL).

Notes

External links 

1915 births
1978 deaths
Australian rules footballers from Victoria (Australia)
Hawthorn Football Club players
Australian military personnel of World War II